Jacob Golden is an American singer-songwriter and guitarist from Portland, Oregon.  After the dissolution of his former band, Birthday, in 2000 he has worked as a solo artist and collaborated with different electronica musicians and producers.

Biography 
Golden's debut album Hallelujah World was released in 2002 on Rough Trade. Featured on the Faultline album Your Love Means Everything in 2002/2004. His second record Revenge Songs was released on Sawtooth/Echo in 2007.

His song 'On a Saturday' appeared in the series finale of the Fox Drama The O.C..

Revenge Songs 
A self-described admirer of the idea of creating "modern field recordings", most of the album was recorded in Golden's home in Portland, and all background noise has been left in the finished record.  On 'Zero Integrity' an ambulance siren can be heard in the background.  Other tracks were recorded in underground car parks, concrete art galleries and at The Magic Closet in Portland.

Hand made limited edition copies of 'Revenge Songs' were made.

Discography

Studio albums
 Hallelujah World 17 June 2002 (Rough Trade) UK
 Revenge Songs 2007 (Sawtooth Records/Echo) UK

EPs and singles
 "Welcome to Life" EP (Birthday) 2000 (Rough Trade) UK
 "Jacob Golden EP" 16 July 2001 (Rough Trade) UK
 "Come on Over" 28 October 2002 UK

Compilations 
 On a Saturday (soundtrack, The O.C., 2007)

Collaborations 
 Birthday – Welcome to Life EP (2000)
 Faultline – Your Love Means Everything (album, 2002)
 (Bitter Kiss (vocals, guitars, keyboards, percussions), Where Is My Boy (guitar with Chris Martin of Coldplay on vocals) and Green Fields (backing vocals with Michael Stipe of R.E.M. on front vocals)
 Nitin Sawhney – Human (album, 2003)
 (Vocals on Say Hello and Falling Angels)
 Faultline – Your Love Means Everything (re-release without track Bitter Kiss, 2004)
 Nitin Sawhney – Philtre (album, 2005)   vocals on Everything
 Little Foxes – Little Foxes EP. (2006)

References

External links
 Official website
 Jacob Golden at MySpace
 Jacob Golden at MusicBrainz
 Jacob Golden at Discogs
 Interview from The Independent
 Interview from Webcuts
 Interview, February 2008 from stv.tv/music
 Strangers Almanac Column on Jacob Golden from Glide Magazine

American rock singers
Songwriters from California
Musicians from Sacramento, California
1970s births
Living people
Singers from California
21st-century American singers
21st-century American male singers
American male songwriters